Saint-Gervais-les-Trois-Clochers is a commune in the Vienne department in the Nouvelle-Aquitaine region in western France.

Demographics

Personalities
 Georges Gilles de la Tourette, neurologist

See also
Communes of the Vienne department

References

Communes of Vienne